Henao is a Spanish surname derived from the Spanish name for the Hainaut region. Notable people with the surname include:

Alexandra Henao (born c. 1970), Venezuelan cinematographer and film director
Carolina Colorado Henao (born 1987), Colombian swimmer
Jorge Henão (born 1962), Venezuelan swimmer
Juan Carlos Henao (born 1971), Colombian footballer
Mauricio Henao (born 1987), American actor
Sergio Henao (born 1987), Colombian cyclist
Zulay Henao (born 1979), Colombian-American actor

Spanish-language surnames